Splendrillia chathamensis is a species of sea snail, a marine gastropod mollusk in the family Drilliidae.

Description
The length of the shell attains 10.5 mm, its diameter 4.3 mm.

Distribution
S. chathamensis can be found in the waters surrounding the Western Chatham Rise, New Zealand. at a depth of 850 m.

References

  Tucker, J.K. 2004 Catalog of recent and fossil turrids (Mollusca: Gastropoda). Zootaxa 682:1–1295.

External links

chathamensis
Gastropods of New Zealand
Gastropods described in 1989